The 2nd Army Corps was first formed before World War I. During World War II it fought in the Campaign for France in 1940 and during the 1944–45 campaigns in southern France, the Vosges Mountains, Alsace, and southwestern Germany. It was active under the First Army for many years after World War II.

World War I
2e Corps was one of five corps of the Fifth Army and upon mobilization consisted of the 3rd and 4th Infantry Divisions. 2 Corps headquarters in 1914 was in Amiens. Commanders were:
 At mobilization: Gen. Gérard
 24 Jul 1915: Gen. Herr
 10 Aug 1915: Gen. Duchêne
 29 Dec 1916: Gen. Buat
 2 Jan 1917: Gen. Cadoudal
 11 Jun 1918: Gen. Philipot
2e Corps received credit for participation in these battles:
 Aug 1914: Battle of the Ardennes
 Aug 1914: Battle of the Meuse
 Sep 1914: Battle of the Marne
 Sep 1914: Battle of Vitry
 Feb 1915: First battle of Champagne
 Apr 1915: First battle of Woëvre
 Feb 1916: Battle of Verdun
 Jul 1916: Battle of the Somme
 May 1918: Third battle of the Aisne
 Jun 1918: Battle of Matz
 Jul 1918: Second battle of the Marne
 Sep 1918: Battle of Champagne and the Argonne

World War II
In 1940, the 2 Corps d'Armée Motorisé was one of three corps of the Ninth Army and consisted of the 4th Light Cavalry Division and 5th Motorized Division. During the Battle of France, its commander general Jean Bouffet was killed and after the French capitulation, the Corps was dissolved on 26 May 1940.

After Operation Torch, the French troops in North Africa joined the allies, and a new 2nd Army Corps was created in Algeria on 16 August 1943. In November 1943, units of the 2nd Army Corps were used to create the French Expeditionary Corps (1943–44), which fought in Italy.
In September 1944, the 2nd Army Corps landed in the Provence and later liberated Lyon, Autun, Dijon and Chaumont. After having taken over the Vosges and Alsace, the 2nd Army Corps victoriously defended Strasbourg against the German counter-attack in January 1945.
In April and May the Corps took part in the German campaign and captured Stuttgart.

In 1944–45, the 2nd Army Corps was subordinated to the First Army. During the campaigns in France and Germany, many divisions served with the corps but the 1st March Infantry Division, the 3rd Algerian Infantry Division, and the 9th Colonial Infantry Division spent several months under 2nd Army Corps command.

The 10th Infantry Division spent its last active months in the French occupation zone in Germany under the command of the 2nd Army Corps.

commanders 
 general Edgard de Larminat (16.08.1943 – 31.08.1944)
 general Joseph de Goislard de Monsabert (31.08.1944 - 24.07.1945)

Cold War

In 1984-5 and 1989, 2nd Army Corps was headquartered in Baden-Baden, Germany, and controlled the 3rd and 5th Armored Divisions, as well as the 15th Infantry Division. 

Corps troops in 1985 included 32 and 74 Regiments de Artillerie, with the Pluton SSM; two regiments of 155mm self-propelled guns; a target acquisition regiment; 51 and 53 Regiments de Artillerie with Roland; two regiments of engineers; 3e Regiment de Hussards, a reconnaissance unit; and two helicopter units.

Major General Sengeisen (Jean, Pierre) was appointed Deputy General Commanding the 2nd Army Corps and Commander-in-Chief of the French forces in Germany as of October 1, 1991.

The corps was disestablished on 31 August 1993 at a ceremony at Puységur, Oos, Baden-Württemberg, a part of Baden-Baden. The last commander was General Michel Cavaillé.

With the end of the Cold War, the French Army underwent significant reorganization and no longer has any numbered corps headquarters.

References 

 
 Les Armées Françaises dans la Grande Guerre. Army Corps. Armée Service Historique. Paris: Imprimerie Nationale, 1922.

See also 
1st Army Corps (France) also part of the French First army during World War II

Further reading
 Cordesman – Anthony H. Cordesman, NATO's Central Region Forces, London: Jane's Publishing Company Ltd., 1988.
 GUF – Guerre 1939 – 1945. Les Grandes Unités Françaises. Armée de Terre, Service Historique. Paris: Imprimerie Nationale, 1967.
David G. Haglund and Olaf Mager (eds), Homeward bound? : allied forces in the new Germany, Westview Press, 1992. xi, 299 p. : ill. ; 22 cm. .  

002
002
002
Military units and formations established in the 1910s
Military units and formations disestablished in 1993